Dolores Hayden  is an American professor emerita of architecture, urbanism, and American studies at Yale University. She is an urban historian, architect, author, and poet. Hayden has made innovative contributions to the understanding of the social importance of urban space and to the history of the built environment in the United States.

Background
Hayden received her B.A. from Mount Holyoke College in 1966. She also studied at Cambridge University and the Harvard Graduate School of Design where she obtained her professional degree in architecture.  She is the widow of sociologist and novelist, Peter H. Marris and is the mother of Laura Hayden Marris.

Career
Since 1973, Hayden has held academic appointments at MIT, UC Berkeley, UCLA, and Yale. She has taught courses in architecture, urban landscapes, urban planning, and American studies.

She founded a Los Angeles-based non-profit arts and humanities group called The Power of Place which was active from 1984 to 1991. The goal of the organization was to, "celebrate the historic landscape of the center of the city and its ethnic diversity. Under her direction, collaborative projects on an African American midwife's homestead, a Latina garment workers' union headquarters, and Japanese-American flower fields engaged citizens, historians, artists, and designers in examining and commemorating the working lives of ordinary citizens." This is documented in the text, The Power of Place: Urban Landscapes as Public History.

Awards
American Library Association Notable Book
Award for Excellence in Design Research from the National Endowment for the Arts
Paul Davidoff Award for an outstanding book in Urban Planning from the ACSP
Diana Donald Award for feminist scholarship from the American Planning Association
Vincent Scully Prize, National Building Museum, 2022
Matilde Ucelay Award, Spanish Ministry of Transport and Urban Agendas, 2022

Selected bibliography

Books
Exuberance: Poems, Red Hen Press, 2019.
American Yard: Poems, 2004.
 A Field Guide to Sprawl, W W Norton, 2004.
 Building Suburbia: Green Fields and Urban Growth, 1820-2000, Pantheon, 2003.
 Redesigning the American Dream: Gender, Housing, and Family Life, W W Norton, 1984, rev. ed. 2002.
 The Power of Place: Urban Landscapes as Public History, MIT Press, 1995.
 The Grand Domestic Revolution: A History of Feminist Designs for American Homes, Neighborhoods, and Cities, MIT Press, 1981.
 Seven American Utopias: The Architecture of Communitarian Socialism, 1790-1975,  MIT Press, 1976.

Chapters
 'Challenging the American Domestic Ideal', featured in Women in American Architecture: A Historic and Contemporary Perspective (1977)
 'Catharine Beecher and the Politics of Housework', featured in Women in American Architecture: A Historic and Contemporary Perspective (1977)

Articles
 —— (1980). "What Would a Non-Sexist City Look Like? Speculations on Housing, Urban Design, and Human Work". 5 (3): S170–S187. JSTOR 3173814.

References

External links 
"What Would a Non-Sexist City Look Like? Speculations on Housing, Urban Design, and Human Work"
Video: Edible Estates: Attack on the Front Lawn at LIVE from the New York Public Library, March 7, 2008
Official site
 Yale "Gender Matters article
Interview on Weekend America September 27, 2008

Urban theorists
Mount Holyoke College alumni
Harvard Graduate School of Design alumni
Yale School of Architecture faculty
Living people
Alumni of the University of Cambridge
21st-century American historians
American women historians
Historians of urban planning
MIT School of Architecture and Planning faculty
21st-century American women writers
Year of birth missing (living people)
Materialist feminists
American women poets